Fourah Bay College is a public university in the neighbourhood of Mount Aureol in Freetown, Sierra Leone. Founded on 18 February 1827,  it is the first western-style university built in Sub-Saharan Africa and, furthermore, the first university-level institution in Africa. It is a constituent college of the University of Sierra Leone (USL) and was formerly affiliated with Durham University (1876–1967).

History

Foundation
The college was established in February 1827 as an Anglican missionary school by the Church Missionary Society with support from Charles MacCarthy, the governor of Sierra Leone. Samuel Ajayi Crowther was the first student to be enrolled at Fourah Bay. Fourah Bay College soon became a magnet for Sierra Leone Creoles and other Africans seeking higher education in British West Africa. These included Nigerians, Ghanaians, Ivorians and many more, especially in the fields of theology and education. It was the first western-style university in West Africa. Under colonialism, Freetown was known as the "Athens of Africa" due to the large number of excellent schools in Freetown and surrounding areas.

The first black principal of the university was an African-American missionary, Reverend Edward Jones from South Carolina, United States. Lamina Sankoh was a prominent early academic; Francis Heiser was principal from 1920 to 1922. Davidson Nicol was the first Sierra Leonean principal in 1966. In 1985 unrest broke out in Fourah Bay College following a purge of those suspected of militancy inspired by Gaddafi's Green Book, and retaliatory violence and arrests ensued.

Old Fourah Bay College Building

Governor William Fergusson laid the foundation stone of the original Fourah Bay College building when construction started in 1845, with construction supervised by Edward Jones, who became the institution's first principal. The original Fourah Bay College building remained in regular use until World War II when the college was temporarily moved outside Freetown. After the war it became the headquarters of Sierra Leone Government Railway and later as a Magistrate court. The building was proclaimed a National Monument in 1955. The building ceased to be in use in early 1990, and caught fire in 1999.

Administration

Faculties
 Faculty of Arts
 Faculty of Engineering
 Faculty of Pure and Applied Sciences
 Faculty of Social Sciences 
 Faculty of Law
Faculty of Applied Accounting

Institutes

Institute of Adult Education and Extra-Mural Studies

Institute of African Studies
Work began on the building of the Institute of African Studies in 1966 with half the £40,000 being provided by the UK Technical Assistance Programme. The first Director was Michael Crowder with J. G. Edowu-Hyde as secretary. The journal Sierra Leone Studies was also relaunched at this time.

Institute of Marine Biology and Oceanography

Institute of Population Studies

Institute of Library, Information and Communication Studies

Students
As of 1998/1999, the student enrollment was around 2,000 in four faculties and five institutes. It had consistently expanded in the 10 previous years.

Notable alumni
See also :Category:Fourah Bay College alumni
 Samuel Ajayi Crowther, one-time Anglican bishop of West Africa
Yvonne Aki-Sawyerr, economist and current mayor of Freetown
 Michael Adekunle Ajasin
 Kelvin Anderson
 Alexander Babatunde Akinyele
 Zainab Bangura
Edward Wilmot Blyden III (1918–2010), political scientist and former dean at Fourah Bay College
 Kojo Botsio
 David Omashola Carew, economist and former cabinet minister
 Henry Rawlingson Carr, educator and administrator
Christian Frederick Cole, first black graduate of Oxford and first African barrister to practice in the English courts
 Robert Wellesley Cole, general surgeon and first West African to become a Fellow of the Royal College of Surgeons
 J. B. Dauda, Foreign Minister
Thomas Decker, writer, poet, journalist, and linguist
 Kenneth Dike, Vice-Chancellor of the University of Ibadan
 M. G. Ejaife
Edward Fasholé-Luke (born 1934) academic and Anglican theologian
 David J. Francis 
 Ibrahim Fofanah, Avionics engineer
Clifford Nelson Fyle, academic and author, known for writing the lyrics to the Sierra Leone National Anthem
 Sam Franklyn Gibson, former mayor of Freetown.
 Ella Koblo Gulama
 J. E. Casely Hayford
Lati Hyde-Forster, first African principal of Annie Walsh Memorial School and first female graduate of Fourah Bay College
 Africanus Horton, surgeon, scientist and political thinker who worked towards African independence a century before it occurred
 Thomas Horatio Jackson
James Ayodele Jenkins-Johnston, barrister and human rights defender 
 Obadiah Johnson
Thomas Sylvester Johnson (1873–1955), educator, theologian and former bishop of Sierra Leone
Eldred Durosimi Jones (1925–2020), linguist, literary critic, university professor and principal of Fourah Bay College
 Abu Bakarr Kanu, Professor of Chemistry at the Winston-Salem State University
 John Karefa-Smart
 Fatou Sanyang Kinteh
 Ernest Bai Koroma, President of Sierra Leone
 Sia Koroma, First Lady
 Tamba Lamina, Sierra Leonean Cabinet Minister
 Sir Milton Margai
 Sam Mbakwe
Arthur Daniel Porter III (1924–2019), author, professor of history and university administrator
 Benjamin Quartey-Papafio
 Frederick Poku Sarkodee, one of the three Ghanaian High Court judges that were martyred on June 30, 1982.
 Kadi Sesay
Moses Nathanael Scott (1911–1988), clergyman and Anglican Bishop of Sierra Leone who later became Archbishop of the Province of West Africa
 Shekou Touray, Permanent Representative of Sierra Leone to the United Nations
Abel Bankole Stronge, lawyer and one-time Speaker of the Parliament of Sierra Leone
John Bankole Thompson (1936–2021), jurist, judge and academic
Akintola Gustavus Wyse (died 2002), author and professor of history at Fourah Bay College

References

External links

 Official Fourah Bay College website
 Fourah Bay College history

 Urhobo Historical Society.

 
Universities and colleges in Sierra Leone
Education in Freetown
Fourah Bay College
British West Africa
1827 establishments in the British Empire